The 2016–17 Indiana Hoosiers men's basketball team represented Indiana University in the 2016–17 NCAA Division I men's basketball season. Their head coach was Tom Crean, in what would ultimately be his final season in Bloomington. The team played its home games at Simon Skjodt Assembly Hall in Bloomington, Indiana, as a member of the Big Ten Conference.

Despite the highs of the previous season and being ranked as high as No. 3 in the nation, the Hoosiers faced a troubling and disappointing year; they finished 18–16 overall and 7–11 in Big Ten play to finish in a tie for 10th place. At the Big Ten tournament they defeated Iowa in the second round to advance to the quarterfinals where they lost to Wisconsin. The Hoosiers missed out on the NCAA tournament and lost in the first round of the NIT, their first appearance since 2005, to Georgia Tech. The game was played at Georgia Tech's McCamish Pavilion because Indiana Athletic Director Fred Glass declined to host a home game at Simon Skjodt Assembly Hall citing concern it would "devalue" the Hoosiers' home court.

On March 16, 2017, Indiana fired Crean after nine years as head coach. On March 25, 2017, the school hired Archie Miller as head coach.

Previous season
The Hoosiers finished the 2015–16 season with a record 27–8, 15–3 in Big Ten play to win the Big Ten regular season title outright, pushing the school's total to 22 conference titles (tied with conference rival, Purdue, for the most). They received the No. 1 seed in the Big Ten tournament, where they made an early quarterfinals exit by losing to Michigan. The team received a No. 5 seed in the NCAA Tournament, and defeated Chattanooga and Kentucky having won two games before being eliminated in the Sweet 16 by North Carolina.

Preseason

Departures

Recruiting class
Indiana was able to land its top recruit in De'Ron Davis, when he announced his commitment to become a Hoosier on November 12, 2015. IU aggressively pursued Davis for more than 3 years, and they eventually beat out Mississippi State for the highly touted 6'9 forward from Aurora, Colorado. After leading Overland High School to two consecutive 5A state championship titles, Davis was crowned 2016 Colorado Mr. Basketball.

On April 24, 2016, a fifth man was added to the recruiting class after JUCO transfer, Freddie McSwain Jr., committed to play for IU. McSwain hails from Hinesville, Georgia and played basketball at Neosho County Community College.

Future recruits

2017–18 team recruits

Roster

Schedule

|-
!colspan=12 style=| Exhibition

|-
!colspan=12 style=| Regular season

|-
!colspan=12 style=| Big Ten tournament

|-
!colspan=12 style=| NIT

Player statistics

Rankings

*AP does not release post-NCAA tournament rankings

See also
2016–17 Indiana Hoosiers women's basketball team

References

Indiana Hoosiers men's basketball seasons
Indiana
Indiana
2016 in sports in Indiana
2017 in sports in Indiana